Asokan Charuvil is an Indian short story writer in Malayalam-language. He is a recipient of several awards including the Kerala Sahitya Akademi Award and Muttathu Varkey Award.

Born in 1957 in Kattoor in Trichur district of Kerala, he completed his education from Karalam High School, SN College, Nattika and SN Teachers Education Institution, Irinjalakuda. He was an officer in the registration department and was a member of the Kerala Public Service Commission. From 2018, he is the general secretary of Purogamana Kala Sahitya Sangham.

List of works
 Sooryakanthikalude Nagaram (1987)
 Parichitha Gandhangal (1993)
 Oru Rathrikku Oru Pakal (1996)
 Marichavarude Kadal
 Kathakalile Veedu
 Daivaviswasathe Kurichu Oru Lakhu Upanyasam
 Chimney Velichathil Prakasikkunna Lokam
 Kangaroo Nrutham
 Asokan Charuvilinte Kathakal
 Clerkumarude Jeevitham
 Kattoor Kadavile Kroorakrithyam
 Chathuravum Sthreekalum
 Jalajeevitham
 Thiranjedutha Kathakal
 Kadalkkarayile Veedu
 Amazon
 Kalppanikkaran
 Karappan

Awards
 1986: Cherukad Award
 1993: Abu Dhabi Sakthi Award - Parichitha Gandhangal
 1995: Edasseri Award – Oru Rathrikku Oru Pakal
 1998: Kerala Sahitya Akademi Award for Story – Oru Rathrikku Oru Pakal
 2010: Padmarajan Award – Amazon
 2014: Muttathu Varkey Award
 2014: Abu Dhabi Sakthi Award - Novellakal

References

Further reading
 

Living people
1957 births
People from Thrissur district
21st-century Indian writers
Indian male short story writers
Writers from Kerala
Malayalam-language writers
Malayalam short story writers
Recipients of the Kerala Sahitya Akademi Award